Caloptilia gloriosa is a moth of the family Gracillariidae. It is known from Japan (Hokkaidō, Honshū) and the Russian Far East.

The wingspan is 8.5–10 mm.

The larvae feed on Acer japonicum, Acer mono, Acer palmatum and Acer sieboldianum. They probably mine the leaves of their host plant.

References

gloriosa
Moths of Asia
Moths described in 1966
Moths of Japan